Lecithocera hiarakella is a moth in the family Lecithoceridae. It was described by Viette in 1988. It is found in Madagascar.

References

Moths described in 1988
hiarakella
Moths of Madagascar